Huyton with Roby Urban District was a local government district in Lancashire, England from 1894 to 1974. It consisted of the civil parish of Huyton with Roby which comprised the settlements of Huyton and Roby. It replaced the Huyton with Roby urban sanitary district.

In 1974 it was abolished and its former area was transferred to Merseyside, to be combined with Kirkby Urban District, Prescot Urban District, parts of Whiston Rural District and parts of West Lancashire Rural District to form the present-day Metropolitan Borough of Knowsley.

References

History of Lancashire
Districts of England created by the Local Government Act 1894
Districts of England abolished by the Local Government Act 1972
Local government in the Metropolitan Borough of Knowsley
Urban districts of England